George Houston Brown (February 12, 1810 – August 1, 1865) was an American Whig Party politician, who represented  in the United States House of Representatives from 1851 to 1853.

Biography
Brown was born in Lawrenceville, New Jersey, on February 12, 1810. He attended the common schools and Lawrenceville Academy and graduated from Princeton College in 1828. He was a teacher in Lawrenceville Academy from 1828 to 1830. He studied law at Yale College for one year and also in a law office in Somerville, New Jersey,  was admitted to the bar in 1835 and commenced practice in Somerville. He was a member of the New Jersey Legislative Council from 1842 to 1845, and was a delegate to the New Jersey constitutional convention in 1844.

Brown was elected as a Whig to the Thirty-second Congress, serving in office from March 4, 1851, to March 3, 1853, but was not a candidate for renomination in 1852.

After leaving Congress, he resumed the practice of law. He was associate justice of the New Jersey Supreme Court from 1861 until his death in Somerville, New Jersey, on August 1, 1865, where he was interred in the Somerville Old Cemetery.

References

External links

George Houston Brown at The Political Graveyard

1810 births
1865 deaths
People from Lawrence Township, Mercer County, New Jersey
Whig Party members of the United States House of Representatives from New Jersey
Members of the New Jersey Legislative Council
Justices of the Supreme Court of New Jersey
Politicians from Somerville, New Jersey
New Jersey lawyers
Lawrenceville School alumni
Princeton University alumni
Yale College alumni
Burials in New Jersey
19th-century American judges
19th-century American lawyers